Tenedos is an island in the northeast Aegean Sea, and part of the province Çanakkale of Turkey.

Tenedos may also refer to :

Places 
 Tenedos (Pamphylia), a town of ancient Pamphylia, now in Turkey
 Fort Tenedos, a defunct Zulu fort
 Tenedos Bay

Ships 
 HMS Tenedos, ships and a training establishment of the British Royal Navy
 Tenedos class frigate, sail frigates of the Russian Imperial Navy
 Greek minelayer Tenedos, a minelayer of the Hellenic Navy
 USS Tenedos (1861), a ship of the Stone Fleet of the Union Navy

Animals 
 Tenedos (spider)

See also 
 Battle of Tenedos